Erotique is a 1994 German-American anthology drama film directed by Lizzie Borden, Monika Treut and Clara Law.

Cast

Let's Talk About Love
Kamala Lopez as Rosie
Bryan Cranston as Dr. Robert Stern
Liane Curtis as Murohy

Taboo Parlor
Priscilla Barnes as Claire
Camilla Søeberg as Jukia
Michael Carr as Victor
Peter Kern as Franz
Marianne Sägebrecht as Hilde

Wonton Soup
Tim Lounibos as Adrian
Hayley Man as Ann
Choi Hark-kin as Uncle

Reception
The film has a 0% rating on Rotten Tomatoes.  Owen Gleiberman of Entertainment Weekly graded the film a C.

References

External links
 
 

1990s English-language films
1990s French-language films
1990s Cantonese-language films
1990s Portuguese-language films
German drama films
American drama films
American anthology films
1994 drama films
1994 films
Films directed by Lizzie Borden (director)
Films directed by Clara Law
1994 multilingual films
American multilingual films
German multilingual films
1990s American films
1990s German films